Sir Rawlinson may refer to:
Sir Henry Rawlinson, 1st Baronet (1810–1895), British diplomat and orientalist
Sir Henry Rawlinson, a fictional character created by Vivian Stanshall, used most notably on the LP Sir Henry at Rawlinson End
 Sir Christopher Rawlinson (1806–1888), Indian judge
 Sir Robert Rawlinson (1810–1898), English engineer and sanitarian